The Volgenau School of Engineering is part of the George Mason University College of Engineering and Computing. Based in the Fairfax campus of George Mason University in the Commonwealth of Virginia, the Volgenau School offers programs at the B.S., M.S., and Ph.D. levels.

Established in 1985, the Volgenau School of Engineering was the first engineering school in the United States to focus its scholarship primarily on information technology-based engineering. It was also the first school to offer a doctoral degree in information technology and remains the Commonwealth of Virginia's only school of engineering with its main campus in the National Capital Region.

In conjunction with its 20th anniversary, the school received a $10 million gift from Ernst and Sara Volgenau and was named The Volgenau School of Information Technology and Engineering in honor of this gift. This gift enabled the school to create new academic and research programs in bioengineering.

In April 2009, the school moved to a new building. A portion of the building is reserved as lease space for companies who want to work closely with faculty and students.

Departments
Department of Bioengineering 
Department of Civil, Environmental and Infrastructure Engineering 
Department of Computer Science 
Department of Electrical and Computer Engineering
Department of Information Sciences and Technology
Department of Mechanical Engineering
Department of Statistics 
Department of Systems Engineering and Operations Research

Undergraduate programs 
The school offers the following undergraduate degree programs: 
Applied Computer Science
Information Technology 
Bioengineering 
Civil and Infrastructure Engineering 
Computer Engineering 
Computer Science 
Cyber Security Engineering  
Electrical Engineering 
Mechanical Engineering
Statistics
Systems Engineering

Information Technology

The program is run by the Department of Information Sciences and Technology (IST). It includes web development, computer graphics, information systems, telecommunications, event-driven programming, network administration, and information security. There are currently five areas of Concentrations within the IST Department: Information Security, Database Mining and Programming, Networking and Telecommunications, and Web Development and Multimedia.

Postgraduate programs 
The Volgenau School offers 15 MS degree programs, close to thirty focused 15-credit certificates, and six post-master's degree programs including five Ph.D. programs and an Engineer in IT degree program.

Master of Science Programs 
The school offers the following MS degree programs:
Applied Information Technology
Bioengineering
Biostatistics
Civil and Infrastructure Engineering 
Computer Science
Computer Engineering 
Computer Forensics
Data Analytics Engineering
Electrical Engineering
Geotechnical, Construction, and Structural Engineering, MEng 
Information Security & Assurance
Information Systems
Management of Secure Information Systems 
Operations Research 
Software Engineering 
Statistical Science
Systems Engineering 
Telecommunications

Doctoral programs 
The six PhD programs and the Engineer in IT degree programs are briefly described below.

Ph.D in Bioengineering 
Four concentration areas are currently offered:

Biomedical Imaging; Data-driven Biomechanical Modeling; Nano-scale Bioengineering and NeuroEngineering

Ph.D. in Civil and Infrastructure Engineering 
Students may elect to study in the areas of: environmental engineering, geotechnical engineering, water resources engineering, construction engineering and management, infrastructure systems engineering, structural engineering, or transportation engineering.

Ph.D. in Computer Science 
This nationally ranked program is run by the Computer Science  department and offers research opportunities in many different areas including Algorithms and Theory of Computation, Artificial Intelligence and Robotics, Computer Vision, Computer Science Education, Databases, Data Mining, Graphics and Image Processing, Information Systems, Languages, Parallel and Distributed Computing, Software Engineering, Security, and Systems and Networking.

Ph.D. in Electrical and Computer Engineering 
This program is run by the Department of Electrical and Computer Engineering (ECE). There are currently five areas of active research in the ECE Department: communications and computer networks, computer engineering, control systems and robotics, signal processing, and microelectronics.

Ph.D. in Information Technology 
This program is run by the office of the Senior Associate Dean. Students may conduct their doctoral research under the supervision of any eligible faculty member of any of the school's departments. A student may select to obtain this degree without a specific concentration or in one of the following concentrations: Civil and Infrastructure Engineering, Information Security, Information Systems, and Software Engineering. Choosing a concentration may impose additional requirements and may reduce the program flexibility.

Ph.D. in Statistical Science 
This program is run by the Department of Statistics. Research areas of key departmental faculty in the program include statistical signal processing, biostatistics, statistical genetics, statistical graphics, and data exploration.

Ph.D. in Systems Engineering and Operations Research 
This newly approved program is offered by the Department of Systems Engineering and Operations Research.

Engineer degree in information technology 
This program is run by the office of the Senior Associate Dean. This is not a doctoral degree, but it allows  students to combine advanced course work of the Ph.D. degree in  Information Technology with an applied project. Students may conduct  their project under the supervision of any eligible faculty member of  any of the school's departments.

References 

Engineering schools and colleges in the United States
Engineering universities and colleges in Virginia
George Mason University
1985 establishments in Virginia